Dietmar Burger (born 19 July 1968) is an Austrian  professional darts player who plays in Professional Darts Corporation (PDC) events.

Career

Burger won the Czech Open back-to-back in 2005 and 2006 and then won the Finnish Open in 2007, an event previously won by some of the game's biggest names, such as Phil Taylor, John Lowe, Andy Fordham and Raymond van Barneveld.

In 2008, Burger began playing in the GDC, an organisation affiliated with the Professional Darts Corporation where the highest ranked player earns qualification to the PDC World Darts Championship. Burger won the season's first tournament in Cologne, but early exits in Niedernhausen and another Ramada Hotel led him to slip down the GDC rankings. Burger also went on to win the Austrian National Championship for a second straight year.

In 2009 the GDC was dissolved and replaced with the PDC European Order of Merit which has seen Burger play in fewer tournaments in the PDC circuit.

Burger qualified for the 2011 PDC World Darts Championship after defeating compatriot Christian Kallinger to win the East European qualifying event. He lost in the preliminary round against Magnus Caris by 4 legs to 3, despite being 3-2 up and having darts for the match.

He represented Austria with Mensur Suljović in the 2012 PDC World Cup of Darts and together they were beaten 1–3 by the Netherlands in the second round, having defeated New Zealand in round one. In April, Burger reached the semi-finals of the Home Nation Qualifier for the Austrian Darts Open. He lost 6–1 to Suljović, but still did enough to earn a place in the draw for the event later in the month, where he played Terry Jenkins in the first round and lost 6–4.

In 2014, Burger won through to the semi-finals of the East European Qualifier for the 2015 World Championship, but was narrowly beaten 8–7 by Boris Krčmar. He lost to Rusty Jake Rodriguez in the final of the 2016 Hungarian Open and 10–1 to Zoran Lerchbacher in the final of the East European Qualifier for the 2017 World Championship.

World Championship results

PDC

 2011: Preliminary round (lost to Magnus Caris 3–4) (legs)
 2012: Preliminary round (lost to Christian Perez 0–4) (legs)

References

External links

1968 births
Austrian darts players
Living people
British Darts Organisation players
Professional Darts Corporation former pro tour players
PDC World Cup of Darts Austrian team
21st-century Austrian people